Phua Chu Kang Pte Ltd was a Singaporean sitcom. The sitcom centres on an eccentric general contractor with his trademark yellow boots, curly afro hair and large facial mole. While it carries the traditions of a sitcom, many unusual elements were used such as flashbacks, quick gags and celebrity cameo appearances.

Plot summary and cast

Name for Phua Chu Kang
The name for Phua Chu Kang is based on the Hokkien romanization for the Chinese name 潘厝港.

Phua Chu Kang

The series revolves around the Phua family, most notably Phua Chu Kang (Gurmit Singh), a general contractor who boasts that he is the "Best in Singapore, JB, and some say Batam" - this is despite the fact that he has only two men working for him (names are King Kong [not to be confused with the fictional giant monster] and Ah Boon/Soon/Goon depending on which season) and they are both inept and lazy. He is also noted for his famous cliché or catchphrase:  "Don't play play" (pronounced as "pray pray" according to his articulation). There is also another famous catchphrase, which is known as, "Use your brain!" (pronounced as "blain"). His personal clothing trademarks are his yellow pair of boots (bought in Beach Road), curly hair, a giant black mole, and long nails on his pinky fingers. Phua Chu Kang is portrayed as an "Ah Beng", which is a Singlish slang for a stereotypical, uneducated Chinese gangster, complete with habits such as hoisting one leg up on the seat of a chair when he sits down and growing one long fingernail to scratch his ears.

His family and relations
Phua Chu Kang lives with his wife, Rosie Phua Chin Huay (Irene Ang) who loves gambling by playing mahjong and likes to buy clothes and go to Slimwrap. Phua Chu Kang also lives with his brother, Phua Chu Beng (Pierre Png) who works for PCK Pte Ltd as an architect (his speciality being designing toilets), while Chu Kang is often regarded as strong and witty, Chu Beng is the pliable, soft speaking compliant son. The one person who drives the whole family crazy is Phua Chu Beng's obsessive compulsive vegetarian wife, Margaret Phua Hwee Lian (Tan Kheng Hua) who is the president of the Vegetarian Society of Singapore and consistently makes fun of her brother and sister-in-law. Together, they have a son, Aloysius Phua (Marcus Ng). Another family member is Phua Ah Ma (Neo Swee Lin), Chu Kang and Chu Beng's mother. She left at the end of Season 4 to be with her new lover. Joining the cast after, is Ah Loon (Wendy Ng) who plays Rosie's overbearing mother.

Chu Kang's two lazy workers are the fat King Kong (Charlie Tan) who loves "tau huay" (a Chinese bean curd dessert) and attractive yet slow-witted Ah Goon (Ray Kuan) who dresses in revealing denim cut-offs all the time. During the first season, instead of Ah Goon, Ah Boon (Alwin Low) works with King Kong but was forced to leave after he had to work in Brunei. Ah Soon (Don Yap) replaced Ah Boon thereafter, however Ah Soon was needed to do his National Service (NS), hence Ah Goon took over Ah Soon.

Former cast members
 Edwin Chong acted as Phua Chu Beng (in season 1).

Writers
 Cheng Hui Chin (Seasons 1-4)
 Michelle Susay (Seasons 1-2)

Episodes

Achievements 
Phua Chu Kang Pte Ltd won "Best Comedy Programme" at the Asian Television Awards for six consecutive years from 1998 to 2003. The cast also won "Best Comedy performance by an actress"- Neo Swee Lin (1999), Tan Kheng Hua (2001) and Irene Ang (2002) as well as "Best Comedy performance by an actor"- Gurmit Singh (1998-2001 & 2003).

Other appearances
The Phua Chu Kang character made his first appearance in the second season of Gurmit's World, a comedy in which Gurmit Singh portrayed his 'relatives' in a series of skits.

In The Amazing Race 3, PCK handed out clues at one of the detours. Participants in the race were required to locate a HDB apartment in Choa Chu Kang, Singapore where they would be given the clues by PCK. Apparently, the original idea was to have PCK at the pit stop alongside Phil Keoghan (at the end of every stage of The Amazing Race, there would be a local person dressed in traditional clothing welcoming the contestants to the country), but Singaporeans protested that this would give foreigners the wrong impression of the local people in general.

In 2003, during the SARS outbreak, PCK appeared in a music video called "PCK Sar-vivor Rap". This 4-minute-long music video is to teach the local people on how to prevent SARS in their country. It also comes with an audio version (with remix) of the song. In addition, a limited edition compilation album called "The Sar-vivor Rap" was launched on 1 July 2003. This album also includes 14 bonus tracks from artists such as Mandy Moore, Destiny's Child and Jessica Simpson. In 2020, PCK appeared in a new music video teaching Singaporeans about how to stay safe during the COVID-19 pandemic.

The character made guest appearances in one drama and three other local sitcoms: in the Mandarin drama The Hotel, in the sixth season of Under One Roof where he, King Kong and Ah Goon were called to do renovations for the house of Ah Teck and Dolly's son and daughter-in-law Paul and Anita, played by Andrew Lim and Selena Tan respectively, both in 2001, the Mandarin sitcom My Genie in 2002 together with Rosie, and ABC DJ in 2006 together with Rosie and Ah Goon.

PCK has also appeared on two TV advertisements. He, along with Chu Beng, made his first advertisement appearance regarding the introduction of 3G mobile services and phones in Malaysia by Maxis and an advertisement called Bob's Big Surprise. In 2003, PCK appeared in another commercial in Malaysia introducing plant-based administration for pain relief by Kinohimitsu that was aired on TV1, TV2 and TV3.

On 23 May 2009, Phua Chu Kang and Rosie made their appearances on the Mass Rapid Transit (MRT), as part of a campaign by Singapore Kindness Movement and the public transport authorities. A music video titled "A Happy Journey Starts Like That", similar to the earlier "PCK Sar-vivor Rap", substitutes the security video that is currently shown at LCD displays on other MRT lines. The video reminds that commuters should be gracious and thus creating a happy journey for everyone.

In 2022, the cast reunited after 15 years on an episode on CNA's On The Red Dot series, titled "Phua Chu Kang Reunion: How's Singapore's Favourite Contractor?".

Singlish

This comedy is notable for its characters' use of Singlish (an English-based creole with Malay, Chinese, and other influences) in everyday conversation. Much like another popular Singaporean sitcom, Under One Roof, the show was put under pressure by the government to use formal English instead of intermittently incorporating colloquial Singlish. 

Critics of the show labelled Phua Chu Kang as an inaccurate or perceived undesirable representation of Singapore, and denounced his appearance in The Amazing Race. However, Phua Chu Kang remains popular in Singapore and Malaysia.

In 1999, the second Prime Minister of Singapore, Goh Chok Tong referenced Phua Chu Kang with mixed reception during a speech at the National Day Rally. In response, the show's third season opened with Phua Chu Kang earning a certificate for completing the "BEST English" course, and dialogue had to be conformed to limit the usage of Singlish.

Retrospectively, Gurmit and Pierre agreed that the usage of Singlish gave the show its own unique Singaporean identity.

See also
 Phua Chu Kang Sdn Bhd
 Phua Chu Kang The Movie

References

External links
 
 Phua Chu Kang - The Musical Official Site
 Phua Chu Kang Programme Showcase
 An interview with the show's stars about Phua Chu Kang - The Musical (Article No. 1)
 An interview with the show's stars about Phua Chu Kang - The Musical (Article No. 2)

1997 Singaporean television series debuts
2007 Singaporean television series endings
Fictional gangsters
Singaporean television sitcoms
Fictional companies
Singaporean comedy television series
Channel 5 (Singapore) original programming